Portsmouth City Council is the local authority for the unitary authority of Portsmouth in Hampshire, England. Until 1 April 1997 it was a non-metropolitan district.

Political control
Since the first election to the council in 1973 following the reforms of the Local Government Act 1972, political control of the council has been held by the following parties:

Non-metropolitan district

Unitary authority

Leadership
The leaders of the council since 1994 have been:

Council elections

Non-metropolitan district elections
1973 Portsmouth City Council election
1976 Portsmouth City Council election
1979 Portsmouth City Council election
1983 Portsmouth City Council election (New ward boundaries)
1984 Portsmouth City Council election
1986 Portsmouth City Council election
1987 Portsmouth City Council election
1988 Portsmouth City Council election
1990 Portsmouth City Council election
1991 Portsmouth City Council election
1992 Portsmouth City Council election
1994 Portsmouth City Council election
1995 Portsmouth City Council election
1996 Portsmouth City Council election

Unitary authority elections
1998 Portsmouth City Council election
1999 Portsmouth City Council election
2000 Portsmouth City Council election
2002 Portsmouth City Council election (New ward boundaries increased the number of seats by 3)
2003 Portsmouth City Council election
2004 Portsmouth City Council election
2006 Portsmouth City Council election
2007 Portsmouth City Council election
2008 Portsmouth City Council election
2010 Portsmouth City Council election
2011 Portsmouth City Council election
2012 Portsmouth City Council election
2014 Portsmouth City Council election
2015 Portsmouth City Council election
2016 Portsmouth City Council election
2018 Portsmouth City Council election
2019 Portsmouth City Council election
2021 Portsmouth City Council election

City result maps

By-election results

References

External links
Portsmouth City Council
By-election results

 
Council elections in Hampshire
Elections in Portsmouth
Unitary authority elections in England